Good Sam is a 2019 American-Canadian drama film. The film is a Netflix Original based on Dete Meserve's book of the same name and follows the events of the happenings surrounding an unknown good Samaritan ("Good Sam") who leaves cash on seemingly random doorsteps. The investigative news reporter Kate Bradley (Tiya Sircar) tries to find out Good Sam's true identity.

Plot

Set in NYC, the film is about Kate, a TV reporter for Channel 12 who stumbles upon a story about a series of mysterious, seemingly unconnected 100,000 dollar donations.

The first recipient, Christina, is an older woman who recently had a lot of financial problems. The second, Maria, is a wealthy oncologist, who plans on donating it toward research. The third, Jesse, is a carpenter, recovering financially from a work-related accident. And the fourth, Faith, was a paralegal, who needs it to further her education.

A clue leads Kate to Eric’s apartment, the firefighter who saved her from injury at a recent fire, a dead end because she was looking for his brother Patrick, who had recently died in a sailing accident.  

One of the many who have contacted Kate’s channel about the Good Sam story, Sylvia, sends a video appeal for her mother, who needs expensive medical attention not covered by their insurance. Sylvia later receives money from Good Sam, and simultaneously, Kate begins receiving text messages telling her to meet up with Sylvia's family, so Kate interviews them on camera.

Yet another anonymous text message, asks her to meet up with ‘Good Sam’ alone and with no camera. There, Kate is shocked to find Jack Hansen, a hedge fund manager she had met through her politician father, claiming to be him.

Jack does an exclusive interview with Kate on Channel 12 about being Good Sam, during which he tells her he wanted to share an unusually highly profitable investment with people struggling financially.

The two go out to eat afterwards, but moments after the interview is aired, Channel 9 finds them and asks Jack about being Good Sam. His response sounds almost identical to the one he gave Kate in their interview. which Kate finds suspicious. Confronting him, he says that he may have "over-prepared" for the interview. The following day, when Kate takes Jack to see one of the first people to receive the 100,000, he changes his story about her. That evening, at a dinner party, Kate discovers that Jack is running for Congress, realizing he was just using the Good Sam persona as a tactic for his campaign.

Kate goes to Eric’s for dinner, where she notices a photograph of Eric, his brother, Patrick, and a man with a cap covering his face and a tattoo on his forearm, whom Eric says was a friend of his brother. Eric goes on to explain that he hasn't sailed since his brother died on his boat because he feels responsible for what happened.

Kate realises that Jack did give away $100,000 to each of the last four people, but someone else was the original Good Sam. She does more research into the first four candidates, first face-to-face with Jesse. She discovers how Jesse is connected to Patrick, because she recognises his forearm tattoo from a photo with the Hays brothers in Camden, ME. He then tells her that Patrick had been his best friend, he grew up with him and worked on his sailboat, the Crazy 8 (the 8 on the bags).

The next day, Kate outs Jack on air, and shows how Good Sam inspired his recipients, Christina buying her neighbour a car, Marie donating hers to cancer research, Jesse giving a portion of his to a food bank and Faith setting up a scholarship.

Cast

Reception

It has mixed reviews on other websites, including the Daily Dot and Wherever I Look. Decider simply declares: SKIP IT. Good Sam has been praised for having a diverse cast with a lead who is good at her job, both as a reporter in the movie and an actress. It has been criticized for being too light on plot and having generic characters with little to no backstory.

References

External links 
  on Netflix
 

American drama films
English-language Netflix original films
2019 films
Films about journalists
Films set in New York City
2010s English-language films
2010s American films